Transcontinental Gas Pipe Line (Transco) is a natural gas pipeline which brings gas from the Gulf coast of Texas, Louisiana, Mississippi, and Alabama, through Georgia, South Carolina, North Carolina, Virginia, Maryland, and Pennsylvania to deliver gas to the New Jersey and New York City area.  It is owned by the Williams Companies.  Its FERC code is 29.

Settlements
In an agreement with the EPA and U.S. Department of Justice, the Transcontinental Gas Pipe Line Corporation tests soil and groundwater contamination near its compressor stations. This agreement also included a cleanup program for polychlorinated biphenyl (PCB).

References

External links
Pipeline Electronic Bulletin Board
Williams Transco Gas Pipeline

Natural gas pipelines in the United States
Natural gas pipelines in Louisiana
Natural gas pipelines in Texas
Natural gas pipelines in Mississippi
Natural gas pipelines in Alabama
Natural gas pipelines in Georgia (U.S. state)
Natural gas pipelines in South Carolina
Natural gas pipelines in North Carolina
Natural gas pipelines in Virginia
Natural gas pipelines in Maryland
Natural gas pipelines in Pennsylvania
Natural gas pipelines in New York (state)
Natural gas pipelines in New Jersey

Energy infrastructure on Long Island, New York